International is an adjective (also used as a noun) meaning "between nations".

International may also refer to:

Music

Albums
 International (Kevin Michael album), 2011
 International (New Order album), 2002
 International (The Three Degrees album), 1975
International, 2018 album by L'Algérino

Songs
 The Internationale, the left-wing anthem
 "International" (Chase & Status song), 2014
 "International", by Adventures in Stereo from Monomania, 2000
 "International", by Brass Construction from Renegades, 1984
 "International", by Thomas Leer from The Scale of Ten, 1985
 "International", by Kevin Michael from International (Kevin Michael album), 2011
 "International", by McGuinness Flint from McGuinness Flint, 1970
 "International", by Orchestral Manoeuvres in the Dark from Dazzle Ships, 1983
 "International (Serious)", by Estelle from All of Me, 2012

Politics
 Political international, any transnational organization of political parties having similar ideology or political orientation
 First International (1864–1876), known as the International Workingmen's Association, founded in London in 1864
 Second International (1889–1916), founded after the expulsion of Anarchists from the First International, and a direct ancestor of the Socialist International
 Third International (1919–1943), known as the Communist International or Comintern, founded by Vladimir Lenin
 Fourth International (1938-), founded by Leon Trotsky in opposition to the corruption of the Comintern by Stalinism
 Socialist International (1951-), founded as the Labour and Socialist International (1919–1940), and refounded as the Socialist International in 1951
 Fifth International, a widely mooted but never established successor to the previous Internationals
 Liberal International,  the political international federation for liberal political parties
 Centrist Democrat International,  the Christian Democrat International
 Democratic International,  a 1985 meeting of anti-Communist rebels held at the headquarters of UNITA in Jamba, Angola
 Resistance International,  an international anti-communist organisation that existed between 1983 and 1988
 Pirate Parties International,  a not-for-profit international non-governmental organisation
 National International, a Nationwide Mutual Insurance Company-like Company

Sports
 International sport
 Cap (sport), a player's appearance in a game at international level
 WTA International tournaments, tournaments of the Women's Tennis Association
 International FK, a former name of Molde FK, Norwegian association football club
 A former name of the Scottish Open (snooker), a professional snooker tournament

Transportation
 International, a brand of trucks and diesel engines manufactured by Navistar International, formerly International Harvester
 International (GN train), a Great Northern Railway service between Vancouver, British Columbia and Seattle, Washington
 International (Amtrak train), an Amtrak service between Chicago, Illinois and Toronto, Ontario
 Damascus–Amman train, colloquially referred to as International Train, an international train between Damascus, Syria and Amman, Jordan

Other uses
 International Paint, a brand of the AkzoNobel business unit Marine and Protective Coating
 International, California, former name of Walkermine, California

See also 

 
 Internationality
 "The Internationale", the socialist anthem
 Internationale (disambiguation)
 The International (disambiguation)
 International style (disambiguation)
 Multinational (disambiguation)
 Transnational (disambiguation)
 Supranational (disambiguation)
 [[Subnational (disambiguation)]